Jalen Saunders (born September 30, 1992) is a gridiron football wide receiver who is a free agent. He was most recently a member of the Winnipeg Blue Bombers of the Canadian Football League (CFL). He was drafted by the New York Jets in the fourth round of the 2014 NFL Draft. Saunders was also a member of the Arizona Cardinals, Seattle Seahawks, New Orleans Saints, New England Patriots, Chicago Bears, Hamilton Tiger-Cats, Houston Roughnecks, and Ottawa Redblacks. He played college football at Oklahoma.

High school
Saunders attended Pleasant Grove High School in Elk Grove, California. He averaged nearly 19 yards per catch and scored 11 receiving touchdowns on 46 receptions as a senior with 871 yards receiving in 10 games. He also rushed for 410 yards and averaged eight yards per carry and scored six touchdowns.

He was also an outstanding sprinter, who clocked a 10.54 time in the 100 meters and a 21.41 in the 200 meters as a junior.

He was considered a three-star recruit by Rivals.com.

College career
Saunders accepted a scholarship from Fresno State. As a freshman, he was third on the team in receptions with 27 for 441 yards and three touchdowns, and also had 14 carries for 109 yards on sweeps and reverses. In 2011, he was named first-team All-WAC after he had 1,065 yards on the year on 50 receptions, the ninth 1,000-yard receiving season in Fresno State history. He led the WAC with 12 touchdown catches, which tied for the third-most in program history.

On May 8, 2012, he announced he was transferring to the University of Oklahoma, citing a change in offensive philosophy at Fresno State as the reason for his transfer. After originally being told he'd have to sit one year, he was cleared by the NCAA to play in 2012.

In his premier season with Sooners, Saunders played in nine games with eight starts. Despite sitting out the first four games due to transferring, he totaled 62 receptions for 829 yards and three touchdowns. He tied a school record with 15 catches for 181 yards and set a school record with eight catches in the first quarter vs. Notre Dame (10/27). In 2013, he started all 13 games and was named second-team All-Big 12. He recorded 61 receptions for 729 yards and eight touchdowns, highlighted by a winning performance against Alabama in the Sugar Bowl, in which he recorded 5 receptions for 75 yards and two touchdowns.

Professional career

New York Jets
He was drafted by the New York Jets in the fourth round (104th overall) of the 2014 NFL Draft. In 3 games with the Jets, Saunders returned 6 punts for 26 return yards. He was released by the Jets on September 29, 2014.

Arizona Cardinals
Saunders was signed to the Arizona Cardinals' practice squad on October 1, 2014.

Seattle Seahawks
He was signed to the Seattle Seahawks' practice squad on November 4, 2014.

New Orleans Saints
The New Orleans Saints signed Saunders to their 53-man roster on November 19, 2014, just one day after placing fellow rookie Brandin Cooks on injured reserve.

New England Patriots
On September 1, 2015, the Saints traded Saunders to the New England Patriots for a conditional draft pick. He was released on September 5, 2015.

Chicago Bears
He was signed to the Chicago Bears' practice squad on September 7, 2015. Saunders was not offered a futures contract by the Bears after the 2015 NFL season.

Saunders was suspended for the first 10 games of the 2016 NFL season for violating the substance abuse policy.

Hamilton Tiger-Cats
During April 2017, Saunders participated in The Spring League, a startup developmental league who operates as a showcase for NFL and CFL scouts.

Saunders was one of several Spring League players who signed with professional teams later in the year; in Saunders' case he signed with the Hamilton Tiger-Cats of the Canadian Football League. Despite being released after the preseason, Saunders was assigned to the Hamilton practice roster. After two weeks, Saunders was promoted to the active roster to take the place of star receiver Terrence Toliver, who suffered a torn ACL during Hamilton's opening game of the 2017 season. During his CFL debut on July 8, Saunders recorded 6 catches for 78 yards, making him the most productive receiver for the Ticats. Saunders also had one rush for a single yard in a losing effort against the Saskatchewan Roughriders. Saunders topped his performance the following week, again serving as Hamilton's most productive receiver by catching 5 passes for 147 yards and a touchdown in a loss to the British Columbia Lions. In later weeks, Saunders was also used as a return specialist. During the 16 games he played in, Sanders made 76 catches for 1,170 yards and 4 touchdowns. The following year, Saunders was on pace for an outstanding year, but a season ending injury capped his 2018 production at 739 yards and 2 touchdowns on 45 catches during 9 games played. On December 21, 2018 Saunders and the Ti-Cats agreed to a contract extension, preventing him from becoming a free agent two months later. On May 16, 2019, just prior to training camp for the 2019 season, Saunders was cut by the Tiger-Cats.

Houston Roughnecks
Houston Roughnecks coach June Jones, Saunders's coach in Hamilton, selected Saunders in the seventh round of phase one of the 2020 XFL Draft. He was placed on injured reserve before the start of the regular season on January 21, 2020. He had his contract terminated when the league suspended operations on April 10, 2020.

Ottawa Redblacks
On April 21, 2020, Saunders signed with the Ottawa Redblacks. After the CFL canceled the 2020 season due to the COVID-19 pandemic, Saunders chose to opt-out of his contract with the Redblacks on August 28, 2020. He re-signed with Ottawa on January 11, 2021. Saunders was involved in a car accident in May 2021. He retired from football on June 15, 2021.

Winnipeg Blue Bombers 
On April 14, 2022, Saunders came out of retirement and signed a two-year contract with the Winnipeg Blue Bombers. However, he was released in the early stages of training camp on May 25, 2022. On May 26, 2022 it was reported by the Winnipeg Free Press that the Bombers parted ways with Saunders after he allegedly sexually assaulted a 22-year old woman during the May holiday weekend.

References

External links
Oklahoma Sooners bio 
Fresno State Bulldogs bio

1992 births
Living people
Sportspeople from Elk Grove, California
Players of American football from California
American football wide receivers
Canadian football wide receivers
American players of Canadian football
Oklahoma Sooners football players
Fresno State Bulldogs football players
New York Jets players
Arizona Cardinals players
Seattle Seahawks players
New Orleans Saints players
New England Patriots players
Chicago Bears players
Hamilton Tiger-Cats players
The Spring League players
Houston Roughnecks players
Ottawa Redblacks players
Winnipeg Blue Bombers players